Don Ritchie OAM (1926–2012) was an Australian humanitarian.

Don Ritchie or Donald Ritchie may also refer to:

 Don Ritchie (runner) (1944–2018), a Scottish ultramarathon runner
 Donald A. Ritchie (born 1945), Historian Emeritus of the United States Senate

See also
 Donald Richie (1924–2013), an American author